This is a timeline documenting the events of heavy metal in the year 1981.

Newly formed bands

 Anthrax
 Beowülf
 Black 'n Blue
 Chateaux
 Dark Angel
 Easy Action
 Icon
 Jag Panzer
 Jaguar
 Kat
 Kerber
 Kick Axe
 Killer Dwarfs
 King's X (as Sneak Preview)
 Leatherwolf
 Leviticus
 London
 Loudness
 Manowar
 Mercyful Fate
 Metallica
 Mötley Crüe
 Napalm Death
 Oz
 Overkill
 Pagan Altar
 Pantera
 Pretty Maids
 Queensrÿche
 Ratt
 Rock Goddess
 Rough Cutt
 Running Wild
 Saber Tiger
 Sacred Rite
 Saint
 Savage Grace
 Savatage
 Skitzo
 Slayer
 Sodom
 Sortilège
 Sound Barrier
 Spider
 Stampede
 Steeler
 Stormwitch
 Suicidal Tendencies
 Tesla
 Tobruk
 Turbo
 Twisted Sister
 Tytan
 V8
 Vandenberg
 Vicious Rumors
 Virgin Steele
 Vixen
 Vulcain
 White Wolf
 White Sister
 Wild Dogs
 Wrathchild America

Albums & EPs

 AC/DC – For Those About to Rock We Salute You
 Accept – Breaker
 The Angels, aka Angel City – Night Attack
 Anvil – Hard 'n' Heavy
 April Wine – The Nature of the Beast
 August Redmoon – Fools Are Never Alone (EP)
 Barón  Rojo – Larga vida al Rock and Roll
 Black Angels – Hell Machine
 Blackfoot – Marauder
 Black Sabbath – Mob Rules
 Blue Öyster Cult – Fire of Unknown Origin
 Bow Wow – Hard Dog
 Budgie – Nightflight
 Bullet (Ger) – Execution
 Bodine – Bodine
 Graham Bonnet – Line-Up
 Chinatown - Play it to Death (live)
 Cirith Ungol – Frost and Fire
 Clientelle – Destination Unknown
 Alice Cooper – Special Forces
 Danger (Bel) - Danger
 Dark Star – Dark Star
 Dedringer – Direct Line
 Def Leppard – High 'n' Dry
 Demon – Night of the Demon
 Doc Holliday – Doc Holliday
 Doc Holliday – Doc Holliday Rides Again
 Dokken – Breakin' the Chains (Europe release)
 E.F. Band – Last Laugh Is on You
 Electric Sun – Fire Wind
 Fargo – Frontpage Lover
 Fist (Can) – Fleet Street, aka Thunder in Rock United
 The Friday Rock Show - From BBC Radio 1 – (Compilation, various artists)
 Gaskin – End of the World
 Gillan – Future Shock
 Gillan – Double Trouble
 Girlschool – Hit and Run
 Sammy Hagar – Standing Hampton
 The Handsome Beasts – Beastiality
 Hanoi Rocks – Bangkok Shocks, Saigon Shakes, Hanoi Rocks
 Heavy Metal (soundtrack, various artists)
 Heavy Load – Metal Conquest (EP)
 Helix – White Lace & Black Leather
 Holocaust – The Nightcomers
 Iron Maiden – Killers
 Iron Maiden – Maiden Japan (live EP)
 Joan Jett – Bad Reputation
 Judas Priest – Point of Entry
 Killer – Ladykiller
 KISS – Music from "The Elder"
 KIX – Kix
 Krokus – Hardware
 Legend – Legend
 Lips (Anvil) – Hard 'n' Heavy
 Loosely Tight – Fightin' Society
 Loudness – The Birthday Eve
 Frank Marino – The Power of Rock'n'Roll
 Mass (Ger) - Swiss Connection
 Molly Hatchet – Take No Prisoners
 More – Warhead
 Mother's Finest – Iron Age
 Mötley Crüe – Too Fast for Love
 Motörhead – No Sleep 'til Hammersmith (Live)
 Motörhead & Girlschool – St. Valentine’s Day Massacre (EP)
 Nightwing – Something in the Air 
 No Bros – Heavy Metal Party
 Ted Nugent – Intensities in 10 Cities (live)
 Obús – Prepárate
 Ocean – Ocean
 Ozzy Osbourne – Diary of a Madman
 Overdrive (Swe) – Reflexions (EP)
 Picture – Picture
 Picture – Heavy Metal Ears
 Pat Benatar – Precious Time
 Plasmatics – Beyond the Valley of 1984
 Plasmatics – Metal Priestess (EP)
 Praying Mantis – Time Tells No Lies
 Rage (UK) – Out of Control
 Rainbow – Difficult to Cure
 Raven – Rock Until You Drop
 Revolver – First Shot
 Riot – Fire Down Under
 The Rods – The Rods
 Rose Tattoo – Assault & Battery
 Rush – Moving Pictures
 Rush – Exit...Stage Left (Live)
 Samson – Shock Tactics
 Santers – Shot Down in Flames
 Saracen – Heroes, Saints & Fools
 Saxon – Denim and Leather
 Michael Schenker Group – MSG
 707 – The Second Album
 Billy Squier – Don't Say No
 Starfighters – Starfighters
 Taipan – Taipan (EP)
 Thin Lizzy – Renegade
 38 Special – Wild-Eyed Southern Boys
 Triumph – Allied Forces
 Trust – Marche Ou Crève
 Tygers of Pan Tang – Spellbound
 Tygers of Pan Tang – Crazy Nights
 UFO – The Wild, the Willing and the Innocent
 Van Halen – Fair Warning
 Vardis – The World's Insane
 Venom – Welcome to Hell
 Vic Vergat – Down to the Bone
 Viva – What the Hell Is Going On
 Warning – Warning
 Wild Horses – Stand Your Ground
 Whitesnake – Come an' Get It
 Wishbone Ash - Number the Brave
 Y&T – Earthshaker

Events
 September: Iron Maiden's lead singer Paul Di'Anno leaves the band due to his heavy drinking, and is replaced by Bruce Dickinson.
 November: AC/DC's album For Those About to Rock We Salute You is released.
 Eric Carr joins KISS on drums and makes his songwriting debut with "Under the Rose".

1980s in heavy metal music
Heavy Metal